Ryan is an unincorporated community in Vermilion County, Illinois, United States.

See also
Fairmount, Illinois

References

Unincorporated communities in Vermilion County, Illinois
Unincorporated communities in Illinois